The January 1913 Atlantic coast storm was a strong extratropical cyclone that affected the eastern coast of the United States on January 3, 1913. It resulted in heavy damage due to the high winds and  produced record low pressure readings. The lowest confirmed barometric pressure reading, for a non-tropical system in the continental United States (CONUS)  was recorded during this storm at Canton, New York. This broke the record low of this type set by the January 1886 Blizzard. The lowest pressure reading of this type was later equalled on March 7, 1932 at Block Island, Rhode Island. The next lowest record, was during the October 2010 North American storm complex on October 26, 2010 at Bigfork, Minnesota.

Meteorological history
The storm formed suddenly on the night of January 2–3 and developed into a severe storm with destructive gales and record low pressures on January 3 over eastern Pennsylvania and Virginia. The high winds and low pressures continued over New Jersey, New York, and Massachusetts. It passed over Maine by the next morning.

He also said "the storm had been caused by several small depressions ... combining and forming a cyclone."

Philadelphia recorded its lowest pressure, for the month of January.

Wind and related damage
The schooner Future, heading toward Washington, D.C., was heavily damaged by the storm. The captain and three crewmen were lost overboard. The rest were not rescued until January 6 by the Asuncion de Larrinaga, but three of them did not survive.

The Lillian, one of several open coal barges being towed by the tug Eli B. Conine in the North River, sunk near Battery Park in Manhattan.

Newport News and Norfolk, Virginia were without communications as the telephone and telegraph lines were down. There were reports of water in the James River resembling a tidal wave.

It blew over the steeple of the historic Readington Reformed Church in New Jersey.

References 

1913 Atlantic coast
Atlantic coast
Atlantic coast
1913 Atlantic coast